Amirulhakim Ahmad Lokman (Jawi: أميرولحاكيم أحمد لقمان born 22 September 1991 in Kuching, Sarawak, Malaysia) is a Malaysian actor and currently a broadcast journalist  and news presenter for TV3. He is known for his first television role as Anding in Disney's Waktu Rehat.

References

Living people
1991 births
Malaysian people of Malay descent
Malaysian Muslims
Malaysian television news anchors
Malaysian male actors
Malaysian journalists
People from Kuching
People from Sarawak